Strømmen Stadion is a sports stadium in Strømmen, Skedsmo, Norway. It is currently used mostly for football matches, and is the home ground of Strømmen IF and women's Premier League team Team Strømmen.

The record attendance is about 14,000, from a 1957 cup match where Strømmen played Larvik Turn.

References

External links 
Strømmen Stadion - Nordic Stadiums

Football venues in Norway
Sports venues in Skedsmo
Strømmen IF